Nightmare on 13th is a haunted house in Salt Lake City, Utah. It is one of the largest and longest-running haunted attractions in the United States and is considered one of the best and scariest in the nation. As of 2022, they have been in business for 32 years, and over 60,000 people attend Nightmare on 13th each season. More than 1.5 million people have visited this haunted house.

For the 2022 season, Nightmare on 13th is bringing back The Institute of Terror as a separate and entirely new VIP Exclusive attraction. Tickets will go on sale in August and opening night is on September 16th, 2022.

Nightmare on 13th has been voted one of America's scariest attractions by the Travel Channel.

In 2015, BuzzFeed put Nightmare on 13th on its list of "19 Insane Haunted Houses That'll Literally Scare The Shit Out Of You".

Nightmare on 13th is located at on 300 West and 1300 South, it is in a  warehouse, which was a former car dealership.

History 
The Nightmare on 13th was started by Klane Anderson in 1984 as The Institute of Terror. The Institute of Terror was sold to Troy Barber and Mike Henrie in 1990, as Klane was moving to Atlanta to help start a nuclear robotics division of Westinghouse. Early adoption of robotics and high tech special effects by Klane Anderson were a big attraction of "The Institute of Terror."

In 1993, after three seasons Mike and Troy decided that they wanted to do something that separated them from their competitors:"In 1993 after three successful seasons the decision to put every dime into buying the building proved to be a wise move. By owning their building, Mike and Troy could spend all year working on the Haunted House. This enabled them to separate themselves from the competition."By purchasing the building, it put them in a position to run the haunted house business full-time. This gave them a very strategic advantage over their competitors who ran their haunted houses on the side.

In 1996, Troy and Mike decided that they would attend the Halloween, Costume and Party show which was hosted in Chicago. Once there, they learned some very valuable lessons that would make them more successful:"Mike and Troy realized that they were under priced nationally and that a raise in the price of admission could pay for a substantial investment in the show.  They firmly believed that with each price increase should come a perceived higher value to the customer.  That show opened their eyes to the possibilities before them."After the 9/11 terrorist attacks, the company changed its name to the Nightmare on 13th in 2001.

Nightmare on 13th is a seasonal haunted house open in September and October, but its creators work on it all year long to keep it fresh every year.

Nightmare on 13th is the only haunted attraction that has a fully animated theater show that you watch while you wait in line before going into the actual haunted house. After you enter the haunted house there are over 45 different rooms you travel through which take approximately 45-60 minutes.

The business environment for haunts in Utah is one of the most active in the United States.  Nightmare on 13th is regularly part of the top tier of houses in Utah.

This haunted house was featured on the Travel Channel in 2009 and 2010 and was on the cover of Haunted Attraction Magazine in 2009.

As of 2016, approximately 120 people staff the haunt on any given evening.
Employees get paid minimum wage.

References

External links 
 Nightmare On 13th Haunted House
 Connect 2 Utah
 America Haunts
 Haunted attractions

Haunted attractions (simulated)
Culture of Salt Lake City
Recurring events established in 1990
1990 establishments in Utah
Buildings and structures in Salt Lake City